Finland competed at the 2014 Winter Paralympics in Sochi, Russia, held between 7–16 March 2014.

Medalists

Alpine skiing 

Men

Women

Biathlon 

Men

Women

Cross-country skiing

Men

Women

Relay

Wheelchair curling

Team

Round Robin

Draw 1

Draw 2

Draw 3

Draw 4

Draw 5

Draw 6

Draw 7

Draw 8

Draw 9

See also
Finland at the Paralympics
Finland at the 2014 Winter Olympics

References

Nations at the 2014 Winter Paralympics
2014
Winter Paralympics